Matthew Carter (born 26 May 1996) is an English professional cricketer who plays for Nottinghamshire County Cricket Club. Matt has 2 brothers, Will and Andy who both play high level cricket in Lincolnshire for Bracebridge Heath Cricket Club.

Career 
He took figures of 10/195, including 7/56 in the first-innings, on his first-class cricket debut for Notts against Somserset on a turning pitch in June 2015.
"from a tall classical action with flight, bite and composure, Carter returned the best figures by a spin bowler on Championship debut since Leicestershire's Jack Walsh claimed 7 for 46 against Northamptonshire in 1938"

He made his List A debut for Nottinghamshire in the 2018 Royal London One-Day Cup on 27 May 2018. He made his Twenty20 debut for Nottinghamshire in the 2018 t20 Blast on 17 August 2018. He was drafted by Trent Rockets for the inaugural season of The Hundred. In April 2022, he was bought by the Trent Rockets for the 2022 season of The Hundred.

References

External links

1996 births
Living people
English cricketers
Nottinghamshire cricketers
Lincolnshire cricketers
Trent Rockets cricketers